Bedford Public Library System serves Bedford county in Virginia. The library system is within Region 2 of Virginia Library Association.

Service area 
According to the FY 2014 Institute of Museum and Library Services Data Catalog, the Bedford Public Library System has a service area population of 75,516 with 1 central library and 5 branch libraries.

Branches 
Bedford Central Library (Bedford)
Big Island Library (Big Island)
Forest Library (Forest)
Moneta/SML Library (Moneta)
Montvale Library (Montvale)
Stewartsville Library (Vinton)

References 

Public libraries in Virginia
Education in Bedford County, Virginia